Conjuration or Conjuring may refer to:


Concepts
 Conjuration (summoning), the evocation of spirits or other supernatural entities
 Conjuration, a school of magic in Dungeons & Dragons
 Conjuration (illusion), the performance of stage magic
 Incantation, or a magic spell
 The swearing of an oath, or a conspiracy (archaic use)

Films
 Conjuring (1896 film), an 1896 French short silent film
 The Conjuring Universe, an American supernatural horror film franchise
 The Conjuring, the 2013 first film in the series

Other uses
 Conjuration (EP), a 2003 EP by Behemoth
 Conjuration: Fat Tuesday's Session, a 1983 album by Pepper Adams
 Conjuring (book), a 1992 book by James Randi
 "The Conjuring" (song), a 1986 song by Megadeth

See also
 Conjurer (disambiguation)
 Conjugation (disambiguation)